Ed Montague may refer to:

Ed Montague (shortstop) (1905–1988), American baseball player
Ed Montague (umpire) (born 1948), American baseball umpire

See also
 Edward Montague (disambiguation)